Jover is a surname and given name. Notable people with the name include:

Surname:
Arly Jover, Spanish actress
Èric Jover (born 1977), Andorran politician
José María Jover (1920–2006), Spanish historian
 Jovelle Jover (2018-2022), Spanish,Philippines Writer
Juan Jover (1903–1960), Spanish racing driver
Luis Companys Jover (1882–1940), the 123rd President of Catalonia from 1934
Loui Jover (born 1967), Australian painter and artist
Luis Barceló Jover (1896–1939), Spanish military officer
Manuel Jover (born 1960), French art critic and journalist
María del Mar Jover (born 1988), long jumper from Spain
Mateo Jover[needs IPA], Director of Research of the Interamerican Scout Office

Given name:
Francisco Jover y Casanova (1836–1890), Spanish painter of historical scenes and portraits
Gregorio Jover Cortés (1891–1964), Aragonese anarcho-syndicalist
Jover Hernández, Cuban handball coach of the Cuban national team
Alberto Jover Piamonte, D.D., JCD., (1934–1998), Roman Catholic Archbishop of Jaro, Philippines